Push (also rendered PUSH) is an American primetime soap opera that aired on ABC. The series was about a group of young Olympic hopefuls in training at California Southern University. It aired two episodes in April 1998 before being pulled from the air due to low ratings; a third episode aired on August 6, 1998. It was cancelled after 3 episodes, leaving 5 unaired, two of which, the fourth and fifth episodes, were originally planned to air.

The show is produced by Starboard Home Productions in association with Great Guns Films and Stu Segall Productions, and was distributed by Perry Pictures.

Cast
 Adam Trese as Victor Yates, the gymnastics team coach whose career was ended by a mishap in the 1996 Olympics
 Eddie Mills as Scott Trysfan, a freshman swimming star
 Jason Behr as Dempsey Easton, the former top track and field runner until Milo joined the team
 Maureen Flannigan as Erin Galway, a swimmer with a rich father
 Laurie Fortier as Cara Bradford, a gymnast training for the 2000 Olympics
 Scott Gurney as Tyler Mifflin, a struggling freshman gymnast
 Jaime Pressly as Nikki Lang, an assistant coach of the gymnastics team
 Audrey Wasilewski as Gwen Sheridan, a pharmacology major who doesn't compete in any sports
 Jacobi Wynne as Milo Reynolds, a freshman and the best track and field runner on the team

Episodes

Reception
Push was not well-received critically. Ken Tucker of Entertainment Weekly gave the show a grade of C−, lamenting that "Push is not the musky melodrama I’d hoped for", adding that "Push is already a candidate to be pulled [from the air]." Tom Jicha of the Sun-Sentinel concluded that "Push manages a feat of Olympian proportions. It makes sex, drugs and rock 'n' roll boring." Terry Kelleher of People gave Push a D+ grade, and dismissed the show by saying it was "...nothing more than jock soap opera with a music-video look."

References

External links

Push fan site

1998 American television series debuts
1998 American television series endings
1990s American drama television series
American Broadcasting Company original programming
American primetime television soap operas
American sports television series
Television shows set in California